Baruch (Burry) Chait is an Orthodox Jewish rabbi, musician and composer. He is Rosh Yeshiva of the Israeli high school Maarava Machon Rubin.

Personal life
He is the son of Rabbi Moshe Chait, the former Rosh Yeshiva of Yeshivath Chafetz Chaim of Jerusalem, and is a student of Rabbi Henoch Leibowitz, former Rosh Yeshiva of Yeshiva Chofetz Chaim of Forest Hills, New York.

Music career 
Since the late 1960s, Chait has composed hundreds of Jewish religious songs that still have wide popularity and appeal. Included in this list is his original composition, "Kol Ha'Olam Kulo". He founded several bands including The Rabbis' Sons and Kol Salonika and has published dozens of records. On February 27, 2022, Chait was inducted with the inaugural class of the Jewish Music Hall of Fame.

Educational career 
Chait is the founder of Maarava Machon Rubin, a yeshiva high school that combines religious and secular studies at a level allowing completion of matriculation exams. The school caters to the Haredi sector but due to its inclusion of secular studies it draws many students from American backgrounds.

Writing career 
Chait has written a number of children's educational books on Jewish topics, together with illustrators Gadi Pollack and Yoni Gerstein. Many of his books go under the name of the HaLamdan HaKattan (small scholar) series.

Below is a list of his books:

 The 39 Avoth Melacha of Shabbath
 The Ehrenhaus Middos Series:
 The Incredible Voyage to Good Middos
 The Lost Treasure of Tikun Hamiddos Island
 The Terrifying Trap of the Bad Middos Pirates
 The Katz Haggadah : The Art of Faith and Redemption
 My Friends - The Alef Beis
 Torah Town
 The Desert Diary: The Historic Journey of a Nation with Divine Faith Through a Wilderness to the Promised Land
 Ha'achadim Ve'ha'asafim (Hebrew)

References

External links 
 

Hasidic entertainers
Jewish songwriters
Jewish Israeli musicians
Rosh yeshivas
Haredi rabbis in Israel
Year of birth missing (living people)
Living people
Hasidic music